Narail Sadar is an upazila of Narail District in the Division of Khulna, Bangladesh. Narail Thana was established in 1861 and was converted into an upazila (a sub-district) in 1984. The upazila takes its name from the district and the Bengali word sadar (headquarters).  It is the subdistrict where the district headquarters, Narail town, is located.

Geography
It borders Magura District to the north, Lohagara Upazila to the north and east, Kalia Upazila to the southeast, and Jessore District to the south and west. The Chitra River flows south through the upazila.

Demographics

According to the 2011 Bangladesh census, Narail Sadar Upazila had 62,795 households and a population of 272,872, 18.8% of whom lived in urban areas. 9.4% of the population was under the age of 5. The literacy rate (age 7 and over) was 65.5%, compared to the national average of 51.8%.

Arts and culture
A weeklong festival is held in Narail town in memory of artist SM Sultan every year in January or February. Past events have included an art competition, art exhibition, music, bull fight, horse race, lathi khela, and wrestling. Shorter commemorations are held in August and October, around the anniversaries of his birth and death.

Museums
The SM Sultan Memorial Museum has 13 original Sultan artworks and digital prints of 28 others.

Administration
Narail Sadar Upazila is divided into Narail Municipality and 13 union parishads: Auria, Banshgram, Bhadrabila, Bisali, Chandiborpur, Habokhali, Kalora, Maijpara, Mulia, Shahabad, Sheikhati, Singasholpur, and Tularampur. The union parishads are subdivided into 180 mauzas and 231 villages.

Narail Municipality is subdivided into 9 wards and 24 mahallas.

Transport
The town of Narail is the road transport hub of the district. R720 runs north  to Magura. Within the district, zilla road Z7503 runs east to Lohagara and on to the Kalna ferry ghat on the Madhumati River. Z7502 runs south, across the Nabaganga River at Baroipara Ghat by ferry, and on to Kalia.

Education

There are 16 colleges in the upazila. They include Abdul Hye City College, Maij Para College, and Mirzapur United College. Narail Government Victoria College, founded in 1886, is the only honors level one.

According to Banglapedia, Narail Government High School, founded in 1903, is a notable secondary school.

The madrasa education system includes one fazil and one kamil madrasa.

Notable residents
 Saroj Dutta, communist activist and writer, was born in Narail in 1914 and attended Victoria Collegiate School there.
 Mashrafe Mortaza, cricketer and current captain of the Bangladesh national cricket team was born in Narail in 1983.
 Suvra Mukherjee, First Lady of India, was born in Bhadrabila village and attended primary school in Narail.
 Bijoy Sarkar, poet, baul singer, lyricist, and composer, was born in Dumdi village in 1903.
 SM Sultan, artist, was born in Machimdia village in 1923 and lived most of his life in Narail.

See also
Upazilas of Bangladesh
Districts of Bangladesh
Divisions of Bangladesh

References

Upazilas of Narail District
1861 establishments in British India